Soul Survivors is an album by saxophonist Hank Crawford and organist Jimmy McGriff recorded in 1986 and released on the Milestone label.

Reception 

Allmusic's Scott Yanow said: "The superior material and the infectious swing supplied by McGriff and his rhythm mates inspire Hank Crawford to some of his best playing of the era. Recommended".

Track listing
 "Because of You" (Arthur Hammerstein, Dudley Wilkinson) – 6:02
 "The Frim-Fram Sauce" (Joe Ricardel, Redd Evans) – 8:33
 "The Peeper" (Hank Crawford) – 4:44
 "One Mint Julep" (Rudy Toombs) – 6:44
 "The Second Time Around" (Jimmy Van Heusen, Sammy Cahn) – 6:59		
 "After Supper" (Neal Hefti) – 9:03

Personnel
Hank Crawford  – alto saxophone
Jimmy McGriff – organ, synthesizer
George Benson (tracks 1-3) – guitar
Jim Pittsburgh [AKA Jimmy Ponder] (tracks 4-6) – guitar
Bernard Purdie (tracks 1 & 3-6), Mel Lewis (track 2) − drums

References

Milestone Records albums
Hank Crawford albums
Jimmy McGriff albums
1986 albums
Albums produced by Bob Porter (record producer)
Albums recorded at Van Gelder Studio